Accessory breasts, also known as polymastia, supernumerary breasts, or mammae erraticae, is the condition of having an additional breast. Extra breasts may appear with or without nipples or areolae. It is a condition and a form of atavism which is most prevalent in male humans, and often goes untreated as it is mostly harmless. In recent years, many affected women have had a plastic surgery operation to remove the additional breasts, for purely aesthetic reasons.

A related condition, in which extra nipples form, is called "supernumerary nipple" or "polythelia".

Presentation
In some cases, the accessory breast may not be visible at the surface. In these cases, it may be possible to distinguish their appearance from normal breast tissue with MRI.  In other cases, accessory breasts have been known to lactate, as illustrated in a drawing showing a child nursing at ectopic breast tissue on the lateral thigh.

There is some evidence that the condition may be more common in Native American populations.

Cause
Polymastia typically occurs in the womb during the development. During normal development, breast tissue will develop along the milk line, and additional tissue will disintegrate and be absorbed into the body. Polymastia occurs when the additional tissue does not disintegrate before birth. This condition can be inherited.

See also
 (fertility goddess with many breasts)
Fleischer's syndrome

References 

 A Paper on the Appearance of Multiple Mammaries in Humans, R. Eghardt, Oxford University Press (1923)
 Weird Diseases, B. Hargreaves and M. Wallette, Emu Publishing (2007)

External links 

Congenital disorders of breasts
Accessory body parts